Lauren Camp is an Arab American poet and New Mexico Poet Laureate. Her most recent book, Took House, was awarded the 2021 American Fiction Award in Poetry. One Hundred Hungers (Tupelo Press, 2016) was selected by David Wojahn for the Dorset Prize, and went on to win finalist citations for the Arab American Book Award, the Housatonic Book Award and the Sheila Margaret Motton Book Prize. In reviewing the book, World Literature Today describes "the oddity of diaspora within diaspora through evocative imagery and diction…and direct interrogation of political (and personal) drama.”

Work
According to Jacqueline Kolosov, "One of Camp’s gifts is her ability to conjure both the historical and the mythic past and the joint terrain they inhabit, with a vividness that, at its best, captures moments infused with both sorrow and joy."

Writing in Poet Lore, Margaret Randall said, "Camp pulls together and makes full sense of the questions that have nudged and troubled her…the places claimed by remembering and forgetting, the ways in which gender inhabits time and place, the identity she holds…"

Publishers Weekly says of Camp's work, “There are smaller surprises that intertwine with this larger narrative… the ideas of loss and forgetting become more evident with each poem.”

Electric Literature, in acknowledging One Hundred Hungers for "7 Books of Poetry by Arab American Women," wrote "Camp is a master of the luscious line... It is one of the most sensuous books you’ll ever read and characteristic of the gorgeousness of her work."

Washington Independent Review of Books says of Took House, “It’s as if Camp is holding a magnifying glass in the light until the page beneath it catches fire,” and World Literature Today, in an "Editor’s Pick", states, “The ‘sinew and lava’ of both desire and loss pulse right beneath the surface of the poems…”

She is the subject of an episode of Grace Cavalieri's The Poet and the Poem for The Library of Congress and a long-form interview by David Naimon on Between the Covers. She has presented her poems at the Mayo Clinic, the Oklahoma Center for the Humanities, The Georgia O'Keeffe Museum and the International Studies Institute.

Camp is an inaugural Land Line Resident with Denver Botanic Gardens. She was a juror for the 2014 Neustadt International Prize for Literature and was selected to be one of 100 international artists for 100 Offerings of Peace.

Camp's writing has appeared in Kenyon Review, Pleiades, Poet Lore, Waxwing, Boston Review, Crazyhorse, Beloit Poetry Journal, Weber and the Poem-a-Day series from The Academy of American Poets. The Rumpus published a long interview with Camp about her book, Took House. Her honors include a fellowship from the Black Earth Institute, and translations of her poems to Turkish, Spanish, Arabic and Mandarin.

Books 

 This Business of Wisdom, West End Press, 2010. 
 The Dailiness, Edwin E. Smith Publishing, 2013. 
 One Hundred Hungers, Tupelo Press, 2016. 
 Turquoise Door, 3: A Taos Press, 2018. 
 Took House, Tupelo Press, 2020.

Honors 

 2022 - 2025 New Mexico Poet Laureate
 2022 Grand Canyon Astronomer in Residence
 2021 American Fiction Award in Poetry
 2021 National Indie Excellence Awards (Finalist)
 2021 Independent Press Award (Distinguished Favorite)
 2019 New Mexico-Arizona Book Award (Finalist)
 2017 Arab American Book Award (Finalist)
 2017 Housatonic Book Award (Finalist)
 2016 Sheila Margaret Motton Book Prize (Finalist)
 2014 The Dorset Prize
 2014 RL International Poetry Award
 2014 National Federation of Press Women Poetry Book Prize
 2012 The Anna Davidson Rosenberg Poetry Award

References

External links 

 

American writers of Arab descent
Poets from New York (state)
Cornell University alumni
Emerson College alumni
21st-century American poets